"Gloria" is a song by rock band U2. It is the opening track and second single from the band's 1981 album, October.

It features a chorus sung in Latin, from the liturgical "Gloria in Excelsis Deo." It was one of their lowest-charting singles on the UK singles chart, peaking at #55 but was more successful in Ireland and New Zealand, reaching the Top 20.

Allmusic cited the song as an example of "when U2 marry the message, melody, and sound together... the results are thoroughly impressive," while Pitchfork said the song "displays some musical dynamism, but its Latin-language chorus tempers its anthemic qualities."

Composition
"Gloria" highlights bassist Adam Clayton as it features three styles of playing in one song (using a pick for the most part, playing with fingers during the slide guitar by the Edge, then a "slap & pop" solo towards the end).

The chorus "Gloria in te Domine / Gloria exultate" translates to "Glory in You, Lord / Glory, exalt [Him]" with "exalt" in the imperative mood, a reference to Psalm 30:2 (in te Domine, speravi). The song also contains references to Colossians 2:9-10 ("Only in You I'm complete") and James 5:7-9 ("The door is open / You're standing there").

The song also references Van Morrison's 1964 love song "Gloria." Bono is quoted in the 1994 book Race of Angels:

Live performances
"Gloria" has been played in concert more than 370 times. It was debuted on the October Tour prior to the release of the album, and was introduced as "Gloria and Gloria" by Bono. It was played on every tour up to and including the Lovetown Tour, after which it was not played for fifteen years until the Vertigo Tour where it made several appearances. 
It was once again revived on U2's 2015 Innocence + Experience Tour where it was played second in the set list. It often rotated with other early U2 hits such as "The Electric Co.," and "Out of Control.". The song was played again on the Experience + Innocence Tour, where it often rotated with All Because of You and "Red Flag Day". It was played twice on The Joshua Tree Tour 2019, taking the place of "I Will Follow" both times.

Live recordings of the song appear on Under a Blood Red Sky and the Live at Red Rocks: Under a Blood Red Sky DVD.  A live version from the Hammersmith Palais is also available on the October (Special Edition) CD.

Music video
The "Gloria" video, written and directed by Meiert Avis, was filmed in October 1981 on a barge in Grand Canal Dock in Dublin near Windmill Lane. "Gloria" was the first U2 music video that received heavy airplay on MTV. The video featured U2 playing on a barge while a crowd of onlookers danced. Neither the song nor the video has been included in any of the band's compilations.

Track listing

Charts

See also
List of covers of U2 songs - Gloria

References

1981 singles
CBS Records singles
Island Records singles
U2 songs
Songs written by Bono
Songs written by the Edge
Songs written by Adam Clayton
Songs written by Larry Mullen Jr.
Song recordings produced by Steve Lillywhite
Music videos directed by Meiert Avis
1981 songs